Sheydan (also Romanized as Sheydān) is a village in Beyza Rural District, Beyza District, Sepidan County, Fars Province, Iran. At the 2006 census, its population was 86, in 22 families.

References 

Populated places in Beyza County